Studio 33 was a game developer from Liverpool, UK. It was once partly owned by Psygnosis, making Newman-Haas Racing, Formula One 99, Formula One 2000, Formula One 2001, Formula One Arcade and Destruction Derby Raw for the PlayStation, and Destruction Derby Arenas for the PlayStation 2.

In 1993, SCEE bought out Psygnosis, and Studio 33 was formed by John White, ex Director of Development from 1996 to October 16, 2003. EA bought out Studio 33. EA relocated the studio to Warrington and renamed it EA North West.

References

External links
 (archived)

Defunct video game companies of the United Kingdom
Electronic Arts
Video game development companies